Massachusetts gateway cities are "midsize urban centers that anchor regional economies around the state," facing "stubborn social and economic challenges" while retaining "many assets with unrealized potential."  These communities, which all had a legacy of economic success, have struggled as the state's economy shifted toward skills-centered knowledge sectors (increasingly clustered in and around Boston).

Original cities and the Compact 
The designation was initially applied to eleven cities named in a 2007 report co-authored by the Brookings Institution and the Massachusetts Institute for a New Commonwealth (MassINC). In May 2008 the chief executives of the eleven Gateway Cities gathered at the Old State House in Boston "to sign a compact to unite their administrations in future efforts aimed at economic and community development," asserting their desire to work cooperatively to address issues of common concern.

The original eleven cities are:
Brockton,
Fall River,
Fitchburg,
Haverhill,
Holyoke,
Lawrence,
Lowell,
New Bedford,
Pittsfield,
Springfield, and
Worcester.

Additional cities 
A legislative definition (Section 3A of Chapter 23A of the General Laws of Massachusetts) put in place in 2009 and amended in 2010 expanded the designation of gateway cities with fifteen more locations, for a total of 26 cities. Under the General Laws, gateway cities have a population between 35,000 and 250,000, with an average household income below the state average, and an average educational attainment rate (bachelor's degree or above) below the state average. Updates to the Census data in 2013 led to the addition of two cities (Attleboro and Peabody) for a total of 26 communities.

These cities are:
Attleboro,
Barnstable,
Chelsea,
Chicopee,
Everett,
Leominster,
Lynn,
Malden,
Methuen,
Peabody,
Quincy,
Revere,
Salem,
Taunton, and
Westfield.

Impact 
The Gateway Cities Legislative Caucus was founded in 2008 by State Representative Antonio Cabral and State Senator Stephen Buoniconti.  As House and Senate co-chairs of the Caucus, they were joined by 58 other representatives and 20 other senators who represent Gateway Cities. In 2012, Senator Benjamin Downing replaced retiring Senator Buoniconti as the Senate chair. In 2017, Senator Eric Lesser replaced retiring Senator Downing as the Senate Chair.

The Urban Initiative at the University of Massachusetts Dartmouth was launched by Chancellor Jean MacCormack in direct response to the Gateway Cities report.

In October 2012, MassINC launched the Gateway Cities Innovation Institute.  In 2021, a report by the Federal Reserve Bank of Boston tracked residents who moved from high-poverty neighborhoods and found that while the majority of gateway city residents moved to lower-poverty neighborhoods, they did so less frequently than residents of high-poverty neighborhoods in the city of Boston or elsewhere in the state of Massachusetts; in the fact, the probability of moving to a lower-poverty neighborhood was significantly lower in the gateway cities (60.8%) than in high- poverty neighborhoods in Boston (69.6%) or high-poverty neighborhoods elsewhere in Massachusetts (77.6%.)

References

External links
 Gateway Cities Compact for Community and Economic Development (2008)
 MassINC Gateway Cities Innovation Institute 
 Gateway Cities and Program Information - Massachusetts Executive Office of Housing and Economic Development
 Gateway cities in Massachusetts - Boston Globe editorial series

Economic development organizations in the United States
 Massachusetts
Economy of Massachusetts